John Bosom may refer to:

John Bosom (died 1440), MP for Totnes and Dartmouth
John Bosom (MP for Rochester) in 1407